Maharani College is a girls college in the city of Jaipur, in the state of Rajasthan. The college was established in 1944 and is one of six constituent colleges of University of Rajasthan. It was established on the name of Maharani Gayatri Devi.

References

External links
Homepage

Women's universities and colleges in Jaipur
Educational institutions established in 1944
University of Rajasthan
1944 establishments in India